Stampida is a racing, wooden roller coaster built by Custom Coasters International at PortAventura Park in the resort PortAventura World, Salou, Catalonia, Spain. It is a very rickety roller coaster with many drops and 2 tunnels. It features two parallel tracks with blue and red cars each one, but then they run separately for a while. Finally, they come parallel again to the end of the ride. It shares a part of its route with a kiddie wooden roller coaster named Tomahawk.

Notes 
Stampida is one of only two dual-tracked roller coasters CCI ever built.  The other is the now-defunct Twisted Twins at Kentucky Kingdom.

Awards 

Fireball World Coaster of the Year 2011.

Rides designed by John Wardley
Roller coasters in Spain
Roller coasters introduced in 1997
Western (genre) amusement rides